Garcz is a PKP railway station in Garcz (Pomeranian Voivodeship), Poland.

Lines crossing the station

References 
Garcz article at Polish stations database , URL accessed at 18 March 2006

Railway stations in Pomeranian Voivodeship
Kartuzy County